Zafar is a Persian origin name meaning "victory" or "victor". 

Notable people with the name include:

Given name:
 Bahadur Shah II, last Mughal Emperor, also known by his nom de plume, Zafar
 Zafar Ali Khan, Pakistani writer
 Zafar Ali Naqvi, Indian politician
 Zafarullah Khan, Pakistani statesman, President of the 17th UN General Assembly and President of the International Court of Justice.
 Zafarullah Khan Jamali, Pakistani politician
 Zafar Bangash, Pakistani writer
 Zafar Iqbal (disambiguation), various people
 Zafar Mehmood Mughal, ASC, Chairman Executive of Punjab Bar Council
 Zafar Saifullah, Indian politician
 Zafar Ansari, retired English cricketer of Pakistani descent
 Zafar Usmanov (born 1937),  Soviet and Tajik mathematician  

Middle name:
 Syed Zafar Islam, Indian politician, national spokesman for the Bharatiya Janata Party and current member of the Rajya Sabha

Surname:
 Ali Zafar, Pakistani musician
 Bahadur Shah Zafar, who used the pen name Zafar, last Mughal emperor of India
 Shakila Zafar, Bangladeshi singer
 Wasi Zafar, Pakistani politician
 Shaarik H. Zafar, Special Representative to Muslim Communities, U.S. Department of State
 Faiza Zafar (born 1996), Pakistani squash player
 Madina Zafar (born 1998), Pakistani squash player
 Shirin Zafar (born 1946; commonly known as Shirin Guild), Iranian-born English fashion designer

Fictional characters:
 Zafar Younis, character in the British BBC drama Spooks

Arabic-language surnames
Arabic masculine given names